Alexander Abreu Manresa (September 6, 1976) is a Cuban trumpet player, songwriter and singer. He currently leads the band Havana D'Primera.

He was born in Cienfuegos on September 6, 1976. By the age of 20, he had become a widely recognized Cuban musician after graduating from the National Art Schools (Cuba) (ENA) of Havana in 1994. He went on to be a trumpet teacher at ENA and professor of jazz and Cuban music at the Rhythmic Music Conservatory of Copenhagen in Denmark.

In 2012, he appeared as an actor in the film 7 Days in Havana, in the segment "Tuesday Jam Session" with Emir Kusturica.

Havana D'Primera 

In 2008, Abreu decided to create his own band called Havana D'Primera. Surrounded by musicians from the great timba bands, most of whom played with Issac Delgado, the group recorded their first album entitled Haciendo Historia (EGREM / 2009) and went on to release the albums Pasaporte (Páfata Productions / 2013), La Vuelta al Mundo (Páfata Productions / 2015) and Cantor del Pueblo (Páfata Productions / 2018).

References

1976 births
Living people
Cuban trumpeters
Cuban male songwriters
Musicians from Havana
20th-century Cuban male singers
21st-century Cuban male singers